was a Japanese researcher of Japanese popular culture.

See also

 Shunro Oshikawa

Popular culture studies
Japanese writers
Mystery Writers of Japan Award winners
Edogawa Rampo Prize winners
University of Tokyo alumni
Kagoshima University alumni
1917 births
1999 deaths